The Pavlovsk constituency (No.90) is a Russian legislative constituency in Voronezh Oblast. The constituency covers rural central and southern Voronezh Oblast.

Members elected

Election results

1993

|-
! colspan=2 style="background-color:#E9E9E9;text-align:left;vertical-align:top;" |Candidate
! style="background-color:#E9E9E9;text-align:left;vertical-align:top;" |Party
! style="background-color:#E9E9E9;text-align:right;" |Votes
! style="background-color:#E9E9E9;text-align:right;" |%
|-
|style="background-color:"|
|align=left|Pyotr Matyashov
|align=left|Independent
|
|59.57%
|-
|style="background-color:"|
|align=left|Boris Zhuk
|align=left|Liberal Democratic Party
| -
|11.99%
|-
| colspan="5" style="background-color:#E9E9E9;"|
|- style="font-weight:bold"
| colspan="3" style="text-align:left;" | Total
| 
| 100%
|-
| colspan="5" style="background-color:#E9E9E9;"|
|- style="font-weight:bold"
| colspan="4" |Source:
|
|}

1995

|-
! colspan=2 style="background-color:#E9E9E9;text-align:left;vertical-align:top;" |Candidate
! style="background-color:#E9E9E9;text-align:left;vertical-align:top;" |Party
! style="background-color:#E9E9E9;text-align:right;" |Votes
! style="background-color:#E9E9E9;text-align:right;" |%
|-
|style="background-color:"|
|align=left|Aleksandr Merkulov
|align=left|Communist Party
|
|35.29%
|-
|style="background-color:"|
|align=left|Pyotr Matyashov (incumbent)
|align=left|Independent
|
|10.88%
|-
|style="background-color:"|
|align=left|Aleksey Verbitsky
|align=left|Independent
|
|9.73%
|-
|style="background-color:#FF4400"|
|align=left|Yevgeny Mezentsev
|align=left|Party of Workers' Self-Government
|
|8.37%
|-
|style="background-color:"|
|align=left|Viktor Glebov
|align=left|Liberal Democratic Party
|
|8.07%
|-
|style="background-color:"|
|align=left|Valery Yegorychev
|align=left|Political Movement of Transport Workers
|
|4.92%
|-
|style="background-color:#DA2021"|
|align=left|Nikolay Kuralesin
|align=left|Ivan Rybkin Bloc
|
|4.22%
|-
|style="background-color:"|
|align=left|Valery Yakshin
|align=left|Independent
|
|4.06%
|-
|style="background-color:"|
|align=left|Vladimir Mandrygin
|align=left|Power to the People
|
|2.34%
|-
|style="background-color:"|
|align=left|Anatoly Osadchuk
|align=left|Independent
|
|1.19%
|-
|style="background-color:#000000"|
|colspan=2 |against all
|
|8.84%
|-
| colspan="5" style="background-color:#E9E9E9;"|
|- style="font-weight:bold"
| colspan="3" style="text-align:left;" | Total
| 
| 100%
|-
| colspan="5" style="background-color:#E9E9E9;"|
|- style="font-weight:bold"
| colspan="4" |Source:
|
|}

1997

|-
! colspan=2 style="background-color:#E9E9E9;text-align:left;vertical-align:top;" |Candidate
! style="background-color:#E9E9E9;text-align:left;vertical-align:top;" |Party
! style="background-color:#E9E9E9;text-align:right;" |Votes
! style="background-color:#E9E9E9;text-align:right;" |%
|-
|style="background-color:"|
|align=left|Yelena Panina
|align=left|Independent
|
|68.15%
|-
|style="background-color:"|
|align=left|Mikhail Tsymbalyuk
|align=left|Independent
|
|13.67%
|-
|style="background-color:"|
|align=left|Valery Kuznetsov
|align=left|Independent
|
|7.84%
|-
|style="background-color:"|
|align=left|Ivan Nezhelsky
|align=left|Independent
|
|2.96%
|-
|style="background-color:"|
|align=left|Andrey Kanderov
|align=left|Independent
|
|1.94%
|-
|style="background-color:"|
|align=left|Vladimir Belomytsev
|align=left|Independent
|
|0.70%
|-
|style="background-color:#000000"|
|colspan=2 |against all
|
|4.72%
|-
| colspan="5" style="background-color:#E9E9E9;"|
|- style="font-weight:bold"
| colspan="3" style="text-align:left;" | Total
| 
| 100%
|-
| colspan="5" style="background-color:#E9E9E9;"|
|- style="font-weight:bold"
| colspan="4" |Source:
|
|}

1999

|-
! colspan=2 style="background-color:#E9E9E9;text-align:left;vertical-align:top;" |Candidate
! style="background-color:#E9E9E9;text-align:left;vertical-align:top;" |Party
! style="background-color:#E9E9E9;text-align:right;" |Votes
! style="background-color:#E9E9E9;text-align:right;" |%
|-
|style="background-color:"|
|align=left|Nikolay Olshansky
|align=left|Independent
|
|26.66%
|-
|style="background-color:"|
|align=left|Anatoly Bakulin
|align=left|Communist Party
|
|22.73%
|-
|style="background-color:"|
|align=left|Ivan Lachugin
|align=left|Independent
|
|11.47%
|-
|style="background-color:"|
|align=left|Aleksandr Lysenko
|align=left|Independent
|
|10.77%
|-
|style="background-color:#3B9EDF"|
|align=left|Vladimir Frolov
|align=left|Fatherland – All Russia
|
|5.46%
|-
|style="background-color:"|
|align=left|Yury Goncharov
|align=left|Independent
|
|4.95%
|-
|style="background-color:"|
|align=left|Nikolay Berlev
|align=left|Independent
|
|2.99%
|-
|style="background-color:"|
|align=left|Nikolay Bykov
|align=left|Independent
|
|2.66%
|-
|style="background-color:"|
|align=left|Yuly Zolotovsky
|align=left|Independent
|
|2.05%
|-
|style="background-color:#084284"|
|align=left|Tatyana Vulich
|align=left|Spiritual Heritage
|
|0.76%
|-
|style="background-color:"|
|align=left|Vladimir Yefimov
|align=left|Our Home – Russia
|
|0.69%
|-
|style="background-color:#000000"|
|colspan=2 |against all
|
|7.06%
|-
| colspan="5" style="background-color:#E9E9E9;"|
|- style="font-weight:bold"
| colspan="3" style="text-align:left;" | Total
| 
| 100%
|-
| colspan="5" style="background-color:#E9E9E9;"|
|- style="font-weight:bold"
| colspan="4" |Source:
|
|}

2003

|-
! colspan=2 style="background-color:#E9E9E9;text-align:left;vertical-align:top;" |Candidate
! style="background-color:#E9E9E9;text-align:left;vertical-align:top;" |Party
! style="background-color:#E9E9E9;text-align:right;" |Votes
! style="background-color:#E9E9E9;text-align:right;" |%
|-
|style="background-color:"|
|align=left|Nikolay Olshansky (incumbent)
|align=left|Independent
|
|52.22%
|-
|style="background-color:"|
|align=left|Ruslan Gostev
|align=left|Communist Party
|
|17.95%
|-
|style="background-color: " |
|align=left|Vasily Voronin
|align=left|Rodina
|
|6.52%
|-
|style="background-color:"|
|align=left|Vitaly Danilov
|align=left|Liberal Democratic Party
|
|4.89%
|-
|style="background-color:#1042A5"|
|align=left|Aleksandr Trufanov
|align=left|Union of Right Forces
|
|2.57%
|-
|style="background-color:#164C8C"|
|align=left|Aleksandr Zolotarev
|align=left|United Russian Party Rus'
|
|0.98%
|-
|style="background-color:"|
|align=left|Viktor Melishko
|align=left|Independent
|
|0.78%
|-
|style="background-color:#000000"|
|colspan=2 |against all
|
|12.03%
|-
| colspan="5" style="background-color:#E9E9E9;"|
|- style="font-weight:bold"
| colspan="3" style="text-align:left;" | Total
| 
| 100%
|-
| colspan="5" style="background-color:#E9E9E9;"|
|- style="font-weight:bold"
| colspan="4" |Source:
|
|}

2016

|-
! colspan=2 style="background-color:#E9E9E9;text-align:left;vertical-align:top;" |Candidate
! style="background-color:#E9E9E9;text-align:left;vertical-align:top;" |Party
! style="background-color:#E9E9E9;text-align:right;" |Votes
! style="background-color:#E9E9E9;text-align:right;" |%
|-
|style="background-color: " |
|align=left|Andrey Markov
|align=left|United Russia
|198,149
|62.69%
|-
|style="background-color: " |
|align=left|Ruslan Gostev
|align=left|Communist Party
|39,142
|12.38%
|-
|style="background-color: " |
|align=left|Marina Spitsyna
|align=left|Liberal Democratic Party
|19,148
|6.06%
|-
|style="background-color: " |
|align=left|Vitaly Klimov
|align=left|A Just Russia
|17,479
|5.53%
|-
|style="background-color: " |
|align=left|Sergey Poymanov
|align=left|Patriots of Russia
|16,153
|5.11%
|-
|style="background:"|
|align=left|Yury Shcherbakov
|align=left|Communists of Russia
|11,162
|3.53%
|-
|style="background:"|
|align=left|Marina Lyutikova
|align=left|Party of Growth
|5,283
|1.67%
|-
|style="background:"|
|align=left|Sergey Mushtenko
|align=left|Yabloko
|2,484
|0.79%
|-
|style="background: "| 
|align=left|Mikhail Ochkin
|align=left|The Greens
|2,187
|0.69%
|-
| colspan="5" style="background-color:#E9E9E9;"|
|- style="font-weight:bold"
| colspan="3" style="text-align:left;" | Total
| 316,073
| 100%
|-
| colspan="5" style="background-color:#E9E9E9;"|
|- style="font-weight:bold"
| colspan="4" |Source:
|
|}

2021

|-
! colspan=2 style="background-color:#E9E9E9;text-align:left;vertical-align:top;" |Candidate
! style="background-color:#E9E9E9;text-align:left;vertical-align:top;" |Party
! style="background-color:#E9E9E9;text-align:right;" |Votes
! style="background-color:#E9E9E9;text-align:right;" |%
|-
|style="background-color: " |
|align=left|Aleksey Gordeyev
|align=left|United Russia
|215,522
|72.01%
|-
|style="background-color: " |
|align=left|Denis Roslik
|align=left|Communist Party
|37,378
|12.49%
|-
|style="background-color: " |
|align=left|Olga Sofrina
|align=left|A Just Russia — For Truth
|12,429
|4.15%
|-
|style="background-color: " |
|align=left|Andrey Stepanenko
|align=left|New People
|9,204
|3.08%
|-
|style="background-color: " |
|align=left|Anton Kanevsky
|align=left|Liberal Democratic Party
|8,115
|2.71%
|-
|style="background: "| 
|align=left|Aleksandr Voronov
|align=left|The Greens
|6,497
|2.17%
|-
|style="background-color: " |
|align=left|Konstantin Grachev
|align=left|Rodina
|5,424
|1.81%
|-
| colspan="5" style="background-color:#E9E9E9;"|
|- style="font-weight:bold"
| colspan="3" style="text-align:left;" | Total
| 299,274
| 100%
|-
| colspan="5" style="background-color:#E9E9E9;"|
|- style="font-weight:bold"
| colspan="4" |Source:
|
|}

References

References

Russian legislative constituencies
Politics of Voronezh Oblast